Robert Francis Jenkins (September 4, 1947 – August 9, 2021) was an American television and radio sports announcer, primarily calling Indy car and NASCAR telecasts for ESPN/ABC and later Versus/NBCSN. Jenkins was the radio "Voice of the Indianapolis 500" on the IMS Radio Network from 1990 to 1998, then held the same role on ABC Sports television from 1999 to 2001.

His last position was the lead commentator for NBCSN coverage of the IndyCar Series. He retired from broadcasting after the 2012 IndyCar season finale to care for his wife Pam who was battling brain cancer. After his wife's death that offseason, Jenkins came out of retirement for occasional reserve roles on television, radio, and public address primarily at the Indianapolis Motor Speedway.

Announcing career

Early career
Bob Jenkins was born in Richmond, Indiana, and grew up in the nearby town of Liberty. He graduated from Short High School in 1965 and Indiana University in 1969. A music aficionado, Jenkins wanted to be a radio disc jockey, but instead found work as a radio news reporter. During this timeframe, Jenkins befriended Paul Page, who worked at 1070 WIBC-AM. Page helped Jenkins get his start in motorsports broadcasting, inviting him to serve as a pit reporter for Indy car races on the radio, as well as on television.

For several years, Jenkins was co-anchor for nationally syndicated farm news show, AgDay.

ESPN and ABC
Jenkins was one of the first anchors on ESPN when it debuted in 1979, working there as one of the most senior members of the network until 2003. Despite his status, he rarely, if ever, visited the Bristol, Connecticut studios. Nearly all of his work with the network was at the race track, or at satellite studios in Indianapolis or Charlotte.

His primary duty was anchoring NASCAR on ESPN from 1979 to 2000. His first booth partner was Larry Nuber. Later, he was teamed with Ned Jarrett and Benny Parsons. The trio was one of the most popular announcing crews in NASCAR. By the early 1990s, the crew (sans Jarrett, who was contracted with CBS) would also cover races on ABC Sports, including the Brickyard 400 from 1994 to 2000.

During the 1980s and 1990s, Jenkins also called CART series races, IMSA, Formula One, drag racing, and various other races on ESPN and ABC. By the late 1980s, Paul Page took over as anchor for Indy car racing on ABC/ESPN, with Jenkins focusing primarily on NASCAR. Jenkins hosted the weekly racing magazine show SpeedWeek during most of his tenure at ESPN.

Concurrent to his work on ESPN & ABC, from 1979 to 1998, Jenkins worked on the IMS Radio Network. He reported various positions, including the backstretch, turn four, and served as chief announcer of the Indianapolis 500 from 1990 to 1998. In the 1990s, Jenkins also narrated the annual Indianapolis 500 official highlight films.

By 1999, Jenkins quit the radio crew to focus on television full-time. The ongoing IRL/CART split saw changes in the announcing crews at ESPN/ABC. In addition, ESPN/ABC would be losing NASCAR rights at the end of the 2000 season. Paul Page was assigned to the CART series broadcasts, and Jenkins was moved exclusively to the chief announcing position of the IRL and Indianapolis 500 broadcasts. The arrangement would continue through 2001.

For 2002, with CART floundering, Page was moved back to the IRL, and Jenkins was shifted to the lesser host position. The arrangement created a "crowded" booth with two veteran announcers. In 2003, on Bump Day at the Indy 500 on ESPN, Jenkins made an impassioned commentary, defending the event from media detractors. Many were ridiculing the race and the IRL for struggling to fill the field to the traditional 33 cars.

At the end of the 2003 season, Jenkins was released from ABC/ESPN.

Post ABC/ESPN
After being released from ABC/ESPN in 2003, Jenkins joined the Indianapolis Motor Speedway staff in various roles including public address announcer and designated emcee of various events and press gatherings (such as the Victory Banquet, Last Row Party, and press conferences). The 2003 Brickyard 400 was his first foray as part of the P.A. team. In 2004, he had a short stint as an announcer for Champ Car on Spike TV but was soon fired by the production company. He joined SPEED and was an anchor for Speed News for a little over one year. Jenkins has also been a contributor to WIBC radio in Indianapolis, and the communications director for the Premier Racing Association. In 2006, Jenkins was the chief announcer of the IMS Radio Network for the U.S. Grand Prix, and in 2007, called Indy Pro Series broadcasts on ESPN2. He anchored the Allstate 400 on the radio, his first NASCAR race call since November 2000. For 2007–2008, he returned to the IMS Radio Network for the Indy 500, reporting from the turn two position.

In 2008, Jenkins returned to the ESPN booth for two IndyCar races, the Rexall Edmonton Indy and the Gold Coast Indy 300 at Surfers Paradise. Regular play-by-play announcer Marty Reid was unable to broadcast because of prior engagements.

Versus/NBCSN
In 2009, the IndyCar Series started a new television contract with Versus. Jenkins was signed as the chief announcer, and returned to Indy car racing full-time for the first time since 2001. He opted out of reprising his turn two role on the radio network, but recorded segments for air on the radio broadcast, as all three living "Voices of the 500" (Page, Jenkins, and King) participated in the broadcast. Jenkins worked for Versus in 2009 and 2010.

In 2011, Versus was bought by NBC Sports Group, becoming NBCSN. NBC inherited the IndyCar rights and hired Jenkins to continue as lead announcer for IndyCar on NBC. During the month of May, and on race day at the Indianapolis 500 (which ESPN/ABC still had the rights to), he continued his part-time work on the public address announcing team. Jenkins was involved in NBCSN's practice and qualifying coverage at Indy. In 2012, he announced he would retire at the end of the season, in part due to his wife Pam, who had terminal cancer. She died shortly after the season ended.

For 2013, he worked on the public address system at both the Indianapolis Motor Speedway and the United States Auto Club's Silver Crown Series. Jenkins made a one-time return to NBCSN in a substitute role during Indy 500 Carb Day coverage, as Leigh Diffey was covering that weekend's Monaco Grand Prix for NBC.

Jenkins, still at the Speedway for the public address system, also narrated some vignettes for NBC's NASCAR coverage on both weekday programs and race weekends.

For the 2019 Indianapolis 500, Jenkins and Dan Wheldon were inducted into the Indianapolis Motor Speedway Museum's Hall of Fame.

Indianapolis 500 broadcasting duties
1979-1980: Backstretch reporter (IMS Radio Network)
1981-1989: Turn four reporter (IMS Radio Network)
1990-1998: Chief announcer (IMS Radio Network)
1999-2001: Chief announcer (ABC television)
2002-2003: Host (ABC television)
2004-2006: Indianapolis Motor Speedway Public Address system announcer
2007-2008: Turn two reporter (IMS Radio Network)
2009-2011: Guest analyst: (IMS Radio Network), Post-race coverage (Versus)
2011-2020: Indianapolis Motor Speedway Public Address system announcer (turn 4 in 2013)

Movie credits
Jenkins also had three movie credits, one of which was an on-camera appearance. In order to be realistic, the race announcers in the movie Days of Thunder were the actual ESPN crew of the time, which meant Jenkins was the announcer in several voice-over scenes. While at Speed Channel in 2005, he was the Speed anchor in Talladega Nights: The Ballad of Ricky Bobby. He also did voice over work in the movie Kart Racer.

His voice was used in the EA Sports NASCAR video game series, from NASCAR 98 to NASCAR 2001, the Codemasters video games IndyCar Series and IndyCar Series 2005 as well as the Destineer video game Indianapolis 500 Evolution. He also appeared in the video game Andretti Racing on the PS1.

His most recent work can be heard in the trailer for the independent film Trifocals (March 2007).

Personal life, illness and death
Jenkins was a colon cancer survivor and resided in the Indianapolis area. His wife Pam died from complications of brain cancer in Carmel, Indiana on October 25, 2012. Jenkins revealed on February 16, 2021, that he himself had been diagnosed with brain cancer following a suspected stroke he suffered on December 25, 2020. In the interview, Jenkins stated "I had colon cancer in 1983 and I survived that, and with God's help and my beloved race fans, I'm gonna make it." Jenkins died of brain cancer on August 9, 2021, aged 73.

Jenkins was an aficionado and collector of 1950s and 1960s music, with a collection of over 10,000 45 rpm vinyl records.

Jenkins claimed to have attended every Indianapolis 500 dating back to 1960 - missing only twice (sixty races). He did not go in 1961; in 1965 he was instead on a high school senior trip (though he listened to the race on the radio). His last "500" was in 2021, attending only as a spectator, less than three months before his death.

References

External links

The Official Site of Bob Jenkins

1947 births
2021 deaths
American sports announcers
Motorsport announcers
People from Richmond, Indiana
People from Liberty, Indiana
Deaths from brain cancer in the United States
Deaths from cancer in Indiana
Neurological disease deaths in Indiana
Indiana University alumni